El Vedado is one of the 12 sectors of Hato Rey.

References

Hato Rey, Puerto Rico
Municipality of San Juan